NICE Ltd. is an Israel-based company, specializing in contact center software (NICE CXone), telephone voice recording, data security, surveillance, and Robotic Process Automation as well as systems that analyze recorded data.

The company serves various industries, such as financial services, telecommunications, healthcare, outsourcers, retail, media, travel, service providers, and utilities.

The primary listing of the company's shares is on the Tel Aviv Stock Exchange; where it is part of the TA-35 Index.
Barak Eilam became CEO in April 2014, replacing Zeevi Bregman. Eilam previously headed the company's Americas division. As of November, 2020 the company had ~6,800 employees.

History
NICE was founded in 1986 as Neptune Intelligence Computer Engineering (NICE) by 7 Israeli former army colleagues. The company initially focused on developing technology for security and defense applications, but soon refocused their efforts on civilian applications, mainly for contact center, financial services and business intelligence markets.

In 2016, NICE acquired inContact for a reported $960 million. It was stated at the time of the deal that it would allow NICE to expand their customer services offering and integrate a cloud contact center, using a Contact Center as a Service (CCaaS) approach. Paul Jarman of inContact would continue as CEO to lead the inContact division once integrated into NICE.

In 2018, NICE acquired The Mattersight Corporation. Mattersight was founded as a behavioral analytics software company in 1994, before diversifying into cloud analytics and its SaaS offering. The agreed deal was $90 million, which made the total acquisition price 25% above share value. Mattersight's service offering was integrated into NICE's portfolio of products.

In May 2019, NICE acquired Brand Embassy. It was stated that this would allow them to manage customer interactions across a greater number of platforms, including social media. According to BizJournals, this would include 30 additional channels, such as Facebook, WhatsApp and LinkedIn.

Recently, NICE have been touted by the media as a potential benefactor to the growth of the AI and chatbot industries. In 2021, growth in numerous tech sectors led to NICE receiving a valuation of $17 billion, making it the most valuable company in Israel.

References

External links
 Official website
 

Software companies of Israel
Electronics companies of Israel
Sound recording technology
Call-recording software
Audio storage
Automation software
Film and video technology
Companies established in 1986
1986 establishments in Israel
Companies listed on the Tel Aviv Stock Exchange
Israeli brands
Companies listed on the Nasdaq